Cortaderia is a genus of South American and Central American plants in the Poaceae grass family.

Etymology
The common name pampas grass, though strictly referring to C. selloana, is frequently applied to all species in the genus (and sometimes also to species of Erianthus and Saccharum ravennae). The name of the genus is derived from the Argentine Spanish word cortadera, which in turn refers to the sharp serrations on the leaves. Cortaderia jubata and C. rudiuscula produce copious seed asexually.

Description
The species of Cortaderia are imposing tall grasses growing 1.5–3 m tall, with graceful white inflorescence plumes. They are in widespread use as ornamental plants.

 Species
 Cortaderia araucana Stapf - Chile, Argentina
 Cortaderia atacamensis (Phil.) Pilg. - Chile, Argentina, Bolivia
 Cortaderia bifida Pilg. - Costa Rica, Panama, Venezuela, Colombia, Ecuador, Peru, Bolivia
 Cortaderia boliviensis M.Lyle - Bolivia
 Cortaderia columbiana (Pilg.) Pilg. - Venezuela, Colombia
 Cortaderia hapalotricha (Pilg.) Conert - Costa Rica, Panama, Venezuela, Colombia, Ecuador, Peru, Bolivia
 Cortaderia hieronymi (Kuntze) N.P.Barker & H.P.Linder - Bolivia, Peru, Argentina
 Cortaderia jubata  (Lemoine ex Carrière) Stapf  – Andean pampas grass - Andes of  Colombia, Ecuador, Peru, Bolivia, Argentina; naturalized in Australia, New Zealand, South Africa, Oregon, California, Hawaii
 Cortaderia modesta (Döll) Hack. ex Dusén - southern Brazil
 Cortaderia nitida (Kunth) Pilg. - Costa Rica, Venezuela, Colombia, Ecuador, Peru
 Cortaderia peruviana (Hitchc.) N.P.Barker & H.P.Linder - Ecuador, Peru, Bolivia
 Cortaderia pilosa (d'Urv.) Hack. - Chile, Argentina, Falkland Islands
 Cortaderia planifolia Swallen - Colombia, Peru
 Cortaderia pungens Swallen - Colombia, Peru, Venezuela
 Cortaderia roraimensis (N.E.Br.) Pilg. - Guyana, Venezuela, Colombia, northwestern Brazil
 Cortaderia rudiuscula Stapf - Andes of Chile, Argentina, Peru, Bolivia
 Cortaderia selloana (Schult. & Schult.f.) Asch. & Graebn. – pampas grass - Chile, Argentina, Paraguay, Uruguay, Bolivia; naturalized in parts of northern South America, Mesoamerica, West Indies, southern USA, Australia, New Zealand, Mediterranean Basin, etc.
 Cortaderia sericantha (Steud.) Hitchc. - Colombia, Peru
 Cortaderia speciosa (Nees) Stapf - Chile, Argentina, Bolivia
 Cortaderia vaginata Swallen - southern Brazil

 formerly included
see Austroderia Chionochloa Chusquea Phragmites

References

External links

Danthonioideae
Bunchgrasses of North America
Bunchgrasses of South America
Poaceae genera